Shaun Fitzgibbon (born 24 September 1986) is a New Zealand cricketer. He made his Twenty20 debut for Otago in the Georgie Pie Super Smash on 30 November 2014.

Fitzgibbon retired from representative cricket in February 2020. He was at the time the captain of Southland, who he represented in the Hawke Cup from 2006 to 2020.

See also
 List of Otago representative cricketers

References

External links
 

1986 births
Living people
New Zealand cricketers
Otago cricketers
Cricketers from Invercargill
People educated at Southland Boys' High School